"Gave Up" is a song by American industrial rock band Nine Inch Nails. Written by frontman Trent Reznor and co-produced by Flood, the song serves as the sixth track of Nine Inch Nails' 1992 EP, Broken. The song is noted for its multiple music videos and became a concert favorite during the band's live performances.

Music and lyrics
The song is noted for its aggressive tone, fast tempo and heavier use of guitars, in contrast to Reznor's dance-oriented previous songs from the album Pretty Hate Machine. The song also features prominent use of Mellotron MKIV, which was previously owned by The Beatles' deceased frontman John Lennon. Robotic vocal effects are also present in the song.

Lyrically, the song addresses the themes of isolation, belongingness, self-hatred and agony. Reznor's angst-filled lyrics in this song, such as "After everything I've done I hate myself for what I've become" was regarded as a solidification of his status as "the dark lord of doom."

Music videos

Three different videos exist for "Gave Up". One is footage of the band featuring Marilyn Manson recording the song at the Le Pig studio at 10050 Cielo Drive, the site of where the infamous Tate murders took place. Another is footage of the band performing the song live (directed by Jon Reiss), and one is the original footage of the finale to the Broken movie.

In popular culture 
The song was extensively played during the shooting of the Lost Highway's bowling alley scene, by the demand of the director David Lynch.

References

Bibliography

External links
 Official Nine Inch Nails website

1992 songs
Nine Inch Nails songs
Songs about suicide
Songs written by Trent Reznor
Song recordings produced by Flood (producer)
Song recordings produced by Trent Reznor